Lagbe was a town of ancient Phrygia, now an archaeological site. It was situated northeast of the Lacus Karalitis. It was the seat of a bishop in the third century.

Its site is located near the modern village of Alifahrettin Yaylası in Isparta Province, Turkey.

References

Populated places in Phrygia
Former populated places in Turkey
Archaeological sites in Turkey
History of Isparta Province
Former dioceses in Asia